Stevnsgade Basketball (also known as Stevnsgade, Stevnsgade Supermen, Supermen and SBBK) is a Danish basketball team located in Nørrebro, Copenhagen. Stevnsgade is one of the most winningest teams in Danish men's basketball history, having won 3 national titles (1979, 1980 and 1995) and 4 domestic cups (1980, 1987, 1993 and 1994). The Stevnsgade women's team has won the Danish Cup 6 times.

History

1958–73: The early years 
The club was founded at the local school (Stevnsgade Skole) by teachers and students 5 May 1958. Outright it was decided that the club colors should be white and blue. The first official game was against SISU, the reigning Danish Champions, on October 29, 1961 in a Serie 1 game, the second tier 2 in the Danish basketball pyramid, where SISU participated due to lack of teams in the divisions. In the gymnasium of Joachim-Larsen Skolen, the then homecourt, Stevnsgade lost by a wide margin to the Danish champions: 30-75. The club won promotion to 1. Division for the first time following the 1964–65 season. Stevnsgade won its own division in the regular season and defeated the other Serie 1 Champions (Næstved, Svendborg and ASI Aalborg) in the playoffs. However, Stevnsgade was relegated back to Serie 1 the following season. This started a trend for Stevnsgade who would go back and forth between Serie 1 and 1. Division the following years. It was first in the beginning of the 1970s that Stevnsgade finally settled in 1. Division for good.

1973–99: The golden days 
In the 1970s, 1980s, and 1990s the teams from Copenhagen dominated Danish Basketball. SISU, Falcon, BMS, and Stevnsgade dominated the Danish competitions. Stevnsgade won 26 medals in the league and cup combined. A total of 7 of these were gold as Stevnsgade were crowned Danish champions in 1979, 1980, and 1995 and were cup winners in 1980, 1987, 1993, and 1994. Following the championship in the 1978–79 season Stevnsgade decided to participate in the FIBA European Champions Cup in the 1979–80 season. Stevnsgade faced, amongst others, the German champions Bayer 04 Leverkusen and the European giants from Real Madrid. Real Madrid would go on to win the tournament that year. When Stevnsgade won a back-to-back Danish championship the club decided to once again compete in Europe's elite competition. This time, they faced the great Yugoslav team KK Bosna. However, Stevnsgade could not match these teams and lost all of their European games in both the 1979–80 and 1980–81 season.

In the late 1990s, due to the emergence of Aarhus powerhouse Bakken Bears, the Copenhagen dominance faded and Stevnsgade won fewer titles. Thus, the last set of medals were won in 1997 when the team came in 3rd.

1999–2008: The merger with BK Skjold

2008–15: The reestablishment of Stevnsgade

2015–present: Back in Basketligaen

Arena

Colors and Logos

Team colors 
The team originally played in white and blue uniforms when the club was founded in 1958. From 2004 to 2008, when Stevnsgade was a part of BK Skjold, the club played in BK Skjolds colors: Red, white and black. From 2008 the club has been wearing black and white uniforms.

Logos 
Stevnsgade have primarily had round logos but with many different designs. The current one was created after the split from BK Skjold in 2008.

Men's basketball

Honours 
Total titles: 7

Domestic 
Basketligaen
 Winners (3): 1978–79, 1979–80, 1994–95
 Runners-up (5): 1974–75, 1977–78, 1992–93, 1993–94, 1995–96
 Third place (9): 1972–73, 1975–76, 1976–77, 1980-1981, 1981-1982, 1986-1987, 1989-1990, 1996-1997, 2000–2001

Danish Cup
 Winners (4): 1979, 1986, 1993, 1994
Runners-up (6): 1974, 1982, 1985, 1996, 2000, 2018

European 
Euroleague Basketball
 Winners (0):
 Participants (2): 1979-1980, 1980-1981

Season by season

Women's basketball

Honours

Domestic 
Dameligaen
 Runners-up (7): 1983–84, 1984–85, 2001–02, 2013–14, 2015–16, 2017–18, 2018–19
 Third place (2): 1991–92, 1993–94

Danish Cup
 Winners (6): 1989, 1991, 1992, 2002, 2015, 2016
Runners-up (3): 1984, 1993, 2019

Notable players

References

External links
 
 Eurobasket.com Stevngsade Page

1958 establishments in Denmark
Basketball teams in Denmark
Basketball teams established in 1958
Nørrebro